The Brest tramway located in Brest, Brittany, France consists of a 28-stop, two-branch,  line connecting Porte de Plouzané in the west with Porte de Gouesnou and Porte de Guipavas northeast of the city centre. The end-to-end journey takes 38 minutes. It's operated by RD Brest, and it's part of the Bibus network. The system began service on 23 June 2012. It is expected to serve 50,000 passengers per day. The line is the successor to a tram network that operated in Brest from 1898 to 1944. The network has the distinction of being trilingual (French, English and Breton).

History

Old tram of Brest 
In 1898, the first line of the Brest tram opened. The network was in operation until the city was bombed in 1944. In 1947, it was replaced by trolleybuses, which operated on three lines, with 30 vehicles. From 1963, diesel-powered buses were purchased to modernize the vehicle fleet. From 1965, one-man operation was introduced on the buses, while the trolleybuses still had to be manned by two drivers. For reasons of personnel savings, the trolleybus operation was therefore discontinued on November 9, 1970.

Revival plan 
In 1984, the Urban Community of Brest (CUB), then chaired by Georges Lombard, evokes the return of the tram as part of the development of its urban transport plan. In the following year, a state subsidy completed a finance study for the project. On December 19, 1988, the Community Council of the CUB unanimously votes to create a two-line network. Next year, newly elected mayor of Brest becomes president of the CUB, and Pierre Maille takes over the file. On October 1, 1989, the urban community decided to continue with the technical and financial studies leading to a project of two lines with a total length of 13.5 km. However, in 1990, over 80% of the population have voted against the project in a referendum, which buried the project until the following decade.

In the municipal elections of 2001, François Cuillandre, who succeeded Pierre Maille as mayor of Brest, becomes  the president of the CUB and launches studies concerning a new tramway project. His new project intended to complement the North-South TCSP on a commercial axis of 8 km long, plus 2 km of service roads. By the end of 2002, the project was subsidized at 30%, the first consultations and preliminary studies were launched, and back then the start of work was set to be in 2010. Next year, the start of work was set to start in 2009. In November 2003, when the preliminary consultation was about to end, the mayor of Brest announced that the line would link the Technopôle Brest-Iroise to the Kergaradec business park, serving the streets of Siam and Jean-Jaurès. It was also announced the transport payment, then set at 1.05%, one of the lowest in France, will be gradually reassessed in order to finance the line; it reached the rate of 1.65% in 2007.

In 2006, a new step was taken with the creation of SemTram, the mixed economy company which will be responsible for the project management of the line. The SemTram is a group of companies made up of the SEM companies of the TCSP (SEM of public transport on its own site of the urban community of Brest ) and Egis Rail. The SEM of the TCSP is a local mixed economy company with a capital of €150 thousand, created in April 2006 on deliberation of December 16, 2005, which aims to ensure the project management of the work of the first tram line in Brest. It brings together seven partners who are: Brest Métropole Océane (53%), Caisse des dépôts et consignations (15%), Departmental Council of Finistère(10%), Brest CCI Brest (7%), Crédit Agricole du Finistère (5%), Caisse interfédérale de Crédit mutuel (5%), and Caisse d’épargne de Bretagne (5%).

In February 2007, the community council of Brest Métropole Océane voted to build the Froutven branch at the same time as the rest of the line, bringing its total length to nearly 14.5 km, for an amount estimated in July 2006 at 298 million euros. Completed in May 2007, the consultation presenting the project to the public made it possible to add two additional stations, one in the city center and one in Kergaradec, for a total of 27 stations.

Construction 
Construction work on the platform began in early 2010, followed in June by laying the foundation stone for the maintenance center. The site of the maintenance center is marked by shell demining operations from World War II when the city had been bombed for nearly four years. The demining operations that took place from August 2009 to March 2010 were necessary to remove 16.5 tons of explosives and demolish 11 blockhouses. The first rail was laid and welded by the end of August 2010. Overall, the work in 2010 was devoted to the construction of the platform and the laying of the tracks, while the work in 2011 was devoted to the installation of equipment and the electrical supply, signaling and the development of stations.

In February 2010, a controversy broke out over the choice of the supplier of the granite slabs that decorate the public spaces within the tram network, Eurovia, the Chinese company that won the tender for supplying the granite, was chosen because it was more competitive in price, which was seen by some as ignoring the local granite providers and affecting the sustainable development plans. In May, the metropolis announced that local companies would win part of the contracts, in particular the paving of the Place de Strasbourg.

On the night of August 22 to 23, 2011, a major stage of the work was completed with the installation of the new deck of the Recouvrance bridge, the old deck dating from 1954 with limited tonnage (3.5 tonnes) was replaced for a new structure, making it possible to support the 40 tonnes of a tram train, and equipped with cantilevers for pedestrians on either side. At the end of November 2011, it was announced that the tram would have 28 stations, with the entry into service in 2012 of the Kerlaurent station, whose name was initially attributed to the Eau Blanche station, originally defined as a "reserve" station of the branch of Guipavas, but whose construction of 300 homes nearby motivated the metropolis to build it immediately.

The final phase testing the line operation took place from 5 June to 22 June 2012.

Inauguration 
The line was inaugurated at 11 am, on June 23, 2012, at the end of the Rue de Siam, in front of the Recouvrance bridge, in the presence of the mayor François Cuillandre and the president of the Brittany region Jean-Yves Le Drian, marking the start of two days of festivities including a giant parade and a flashmob on the evening of June 23. The Bibus network was offered for free during the inaugural weekend as well as for the first day of operation.

On October 4, 2012, Tramways & Urban Transitmagazine named the Brest tram the second "best international tram project of the year" tied with the Casablanca and Zaragoza tramways at the Light Rail Awards.

Rolling stock
The line is operated with 20 Alstom Citadis trams, which were jointly purchased with the Dijon tramway to reduce cost. The tram sets are numbered from 1001 to 1020. The first train was delivered on September 7, 2011, from the Alstom factory in Aytré, on the outskirts of La Rochelle. The other train sets were delivered and put into service from November at a rate of around two to three trainsets per month until June 2012.

Cost 
The cost of the project was estimated at €290 million euros in July 2006, distributed as follows:

 Engineering services and project management: €60 million
 Construction of the maintenance center: €15 million
 Purchase of rolling stock: €55 million
 Construction of engineering structures: €10 million
 Construction of track and equipment infrastructure: €158 million

In 2010, the cost increased to €338 million, and eventually to €383 million in 2012.

Trilingualism 
The network has the distinction among French trams of being trilingual; French, English and Breton. This trilingualism is found in audio announcements, card headers, station names, timetables, ticket distributors and various technical information on board trains.

The organizations affiliated with the promotion of the Breton culture such as the Aï'ta and Sked argued that the Brest metropolis has not kept its commitments, particularly with regard to audio announcements, whose versions in Breton are rarely broadcast or only at the terminuses, or even tickets where the choice of Breton was still not active one year after commissioning, and that it even disappeared from certain equipment in 2013.

Stations

Network Map

Around the tram

Tourism 
Line A serves, from west to east, the following places of attraction and monuments:

 Fort Montbarey
 Iroise-Carrefour shopping center
 Brest Arena
 Dupuy-de-Lôme high school
 Église Sainte-Thérèse-du-Landais
 Workshops of the Capucins plateau and the Brest cable car
 Recouvrance district, with many remarkable buildings including the Tanguy tower
 Recouvrance bridge
 The castle, home to the National Maritime Museum
 the Le Quartz performance hall
 the Place de la Liberté and the town hall
 Augustin-Morvan hospital
 Saint-Louis Church
 Saint-Martin district
 ENSTA Bretagne

Artistic approach 
On June 29, 2009, Brest métropole decided to allocate a budget of one million euros for the realization of works of art at the network, while there was already three existing installations.

The seven works produced as part of the construction of the tram are:

 “Les Tickets collection” by Mrzyk & Moriceau (decorated tickets)
 “The Empathic Tree” by Enric Ruiz Geli, at the Château station.
 “Les Jetées” by Didier Faustino, at Strasbourg station
 “Signs of Life” by Olivia Rosenthal and Philippe Bretelle, between the Europe and Pontanézen stations
 “The Recouvrance Generator” by Pierre di Sciullo, between the Recouvrance and Les Capucins stations
 Hughes Germain's “Vibrating Cylinders”, at Dupuy de Lôme station.
 “Data Horizon” by Sylvie Ungauer, at Porte de Plouzané station.

These three installations existed before building the new network:

 “The lakes” by Marta Pan, at the Siam station.
 "Recouvrance" by Marcel Van Thienen at the Fort Montbarey station (formerly located at the bottom of the rue de La Porte when exiting the Pont de Recouvrance).
 “Palaver tree and bulwark” by Bénédicte Klène at the Europe station.

Second line 
In February 2010, the local authorities announced they have started preparing studies for the construction of a second line. Mayor François Cuillandre also said: "We are convinced that the second line will be requested once the first is operational." During the construction of the first line in 2011, various preliminary work was carried out to enable the construction of the second line without serious disruption to operations on the first line.

See also 

 Trams in France
 List of town tramway systems in France

References

External links
 Brest tramway – official website

Transport in Brest, France
Tram transport in France
Brest